Soy candles  are candles made from soy wax, which is a processed form of soybean oil. They are usually container candles, because soy wax typically has a lower melting point than traditional waxes, but can also be made into pillar candles if certain additives are mixed into the soy wax.

Soy wax
Soy wax is made by the full hydrogenation of soybean oil; chemically this gives a triglyceride, containing a high proportion of stearic acid. It is typically softer than paraffin wax and with a lower melting temperature, in most combinations.  However, additives can raise this melting point to temperatures typical for paraffin-based candles. The melting point ranges from 49 to 82 degrees Celsius (130 to 150 degrees Fahrenheit), depending on the blend. The density of soy wax is about 90% that of water or 0.9 g/ml. This means nine pounds (144 oz) of wax will fill about ten 16-oz jars (160 fluid ounces of volume).  Soy wax is available in flake and pellet form and has an off-white, opaque appearance. Its lower melting temperature can mean that candles will melt in hot weather. Since soy wax is usually used in container candles, this is not much of an issue.

Some soy candles are made up of a blend of different waxes, including beeswax, paraffin, or palm wax.

Soy candles

Sоу candles dіѕtrіbutе frаgrаnсеѕ and ѕсеntѕ slightly less than paraffin candles. Paraffin is usually added to make a 'soy blend' which allows for a better scent throw and works better in hotter weather conditions. Soy is often referred to as a superior wax in comparison to paraffin but in reality, there is very little difference in soot production and carcinogenic compounds released by both waxes. The low melting роіnt trаnѕlаtеѕ to сооlеr-burning, longer-lasting саndlеѕ in temperate areas.

Soy candles can also come with coconut wax as an additive because coconut wax is viewed as more sustainable and is softer than soy making for a larger melt pool and disbursement of scent.

References

Candles
Candle